Ashton-Tate Corporation was a US-based software company best known for developing the popular dBASE database application and later acquiring Framework from the Forefront Corporation and MultiMate from Multimate International.  It grew from a small garage-based company to become a multinational corporation. Once one of the "Big Three" software companies, which included Microsoft and Lotus,  the company stumbled in the late 1980s and was sold to Borland in September 1991.

History 
The history of Ashton-Tate and dBASE are intertwined and as such, must be discussed in parallel.

Early history: dBASE II (1981–1983) 
In 1978, Martin Marietta programmer Wayne Ratliff wrote Vulcan, a database application, to help him make picks for football pools. Written in Intel 8080 assembly language, it ran on the CP/M operating system and was modeled on JPLDIS, a Univac 1108 program used at JPL and written by fellow programmer Jeb Long. Ashton-Tate was launched as a result of George Tate and Hal Lashlee having discovered Vulcan from Ratliff in 1981 and licensing it (Ashton was Tate's after-the-fact parrot, whose cage was kept in his Culver City office ).  The original agreement was written on one page, and called for simple, generous royalty payments to Ratliff.

Tate and Lashlee had already built three successful start-up companies by this time: Discount Software (whose president was Ron Dennis, and was one of the first companies to sell PC software programs through the mail to consumers), Software Distributors (CEO Linda Johnson / Mark Vidovich) and Software Center International, the first U.S. software store retail chain, with stores in 32 states. (Glenn Johnson was co-founder along with Tate & Lashlee. SCI was later sold to Wayne Green Publishing.)

Vulcan was sold by SCDP Systems. The founders needed to change the name of the software, because Harris Corporation already had an operating system called Vulcan. Hal Pawluk, who worked for their advertising agency, suggested "dBASE", including the capitalisation. He also suggested that the first release of the product "II" would imply that it was already in its second version, and therefore would be perceived as being more reliable than a first release. The original manual was too complex from Pawluk's perspective, so he wrote a second manual, which was duly included in the package along with the first. Pawluk created the name for the new publishing company by combining George's last name with the fictional Ashton surname, purportedly because it was felt that "Ashton-Tate" sounded better, or was easier to pronounce, than "Lashlee-Tate".

dBASE II had an unusual guarantee. Customers received a crippleware version of the software and a separate, sealed disk with the full version; they could return the unopened disk for a refund within 30 days. The guarantee likely persuaded many to risk purchasing the $700 application. In 1981 the founders hired David C. Cole to be the chairman, president and CEO of their group of companies. The group was called "Software Plus." It did not trade under its own name, but was a holding company for the three startups: Discount Software, Software Distributors, and Ashton-Tate. Cole was given free rein to run the businesses, while George Tate primarily remained involved in Ashton-Tate. Lashlee was somewhat less involved on a day-to-day basis in Ashton-Tate by this time, although he was always aware of and up to speed on all three of the businesses, and was an active board member and officer of SPI.

In June 1982 Cole hired Rod Turner as the director of OEM sales for Ashton-Tate. In a few weeks Turner solved a sales commission plan issue, that had been bothering George Tate for some time, with the top performing salesperson (Barbara Weingarten-Guerra), and Tate and Cole promoted Turner to be Vice President of world-wide sales three weeks after his initial hire. Turner was approximately the 12th employee of Ashton Tate. Since the company was truly boot-strapped, using no external venture capital, the founders did not make a practice of hiring experienced veterans, and most of the team at Ashton-Tate were young and enthusiastic, but inexperienced.  Jim Taylor was responsible for product management in the early days, and worked closely with Wayne Ratliff and the other key developers on dBASE II.  In 1982 Perry Lawrence and Nelson Tso were the two developers who were employed at Ashton-Tate, while Wayne Ratliff employed Jeb Long from his royalty stream.

IBM PC 
dBASE II was ported to the IBM PC (i.e. the MS-DOS operating system) and shipped in September 1982. Pawluk ran advertisements promoting dBASE II for the IBM PC for months before it shipped.  When dBASE II for the IBM PC shipped, it was one of few major applications available on the PC, and that fact, combined with good promotion and sales in the US and internationally, caused dBASE II sales to grow rapidly. Turner expanded Ashton-Tate's international distribution efforts and encouraged exclusive distributors in major markets to translate dBASE II from English to non-English versions. The early presence of dBASE II in international markets, as IBM rolled out the PC in those markets, facilitated rapid growth in sales and market share for dBASE. At one point in 1983, the company's French distributor "La Commande Electronique" (whose owner was Hughes LeBlanc) claimed that "one in ten buyers of a PC in France is buying dBASE II."

In the winter of 1982, Turner recruited the managing director (David Imberg, now David Inbar) for Ashton-Tate's first subsidiary, Ashton-Tate UK. Turner set a goal for Inbar of achieving 15% per month compound revenue growth in the first 18 months (using the prior UK distributor's volume as a starting point), which Inbar accomplished. He subsequently expanded Ashton-Tate's operations across Europe with subsidiaries in Germany and the Netherlands. When Turner brought Inbar to the Culver City, California, corporate headquarters of Ashton-Tate to be trained, the offices were so crowded that the only space available for Inbar was a small desk beside a large photocopier, with no phone line; the offices were so crowded that when Turner needed to conduct a confidential meeting, he would have it standing up in the nearby restroom.

With the growing popularity of ever-larger hard drives on personal computers, dBASE II turned out to be a huge seller. For its time, dBASE was extremely advanced.  It was one of the first database products that ran on a microcomputer, and its programming environment (the dBASE language) allowed it to be used to build a wide variety of custom applications.  Although microcomputers had limited memory and storage at the time, dBASE nevertheless allowed a huge number of small-to-medium-sized tasks to be automated. The value-added resellers (VARs) who developed applications using dBASE became an important early sales channel for dBASE.

By the end of the fiscal year ending in January 1982, the firm had revenues of almost $3.7 million with an operating loss of $313,000 dollars.

Among Cole's early acts was to hire an accountant to set up a financial system, install a management structure, and introduce processes to manage operations and orders. Cole's mission was "to shift the balance of power from those who understand how computers work to those who need what computers can do."

Cole licensed two products in 1982, building on his publishing background. These two unsuccessful products were launched in October 1982: The Financial Planner and The Bottom Line Strategist. The Financial Planner was a sophisticated financial modeling system that used its own internal language - but it was not as widely appealing as spreadsheets like SuperCalc. The Bottom Line Strategist was a template financial analysis system that had very limited flexibility and function. Both were released at the same price as dBASE II, but neither product was aggressively marketed, and both were put into a benign-neglect mode by Turner when it became clear that they did not have sizable potential.

Ashton-Tate: IPO and dBASE III (1983–1985) 
By the end of January 1983, the company was profitable. In February 1983 the company released dBASE II RunTime, which allowed developers to write dBASE applications and then distribute them to customers without them needing to purchase the "full" version of dBASE. The growth in revenue was matched by a growth in employees. The company hired its first Human Resources manager, put together its first benefits package, and moved headquarters to 10150 West Jefferson Boulevard in Culver City.

In May 1983 Cole changed the name of the SPI holding company to be Ashton Tate, which put the company in the position of having a mail order company "Discount Software" and "Software Distributors" as subsidiaries.  The newly renamed holding company promptly sold Discount Software and Software Distributors. Cole negotiated an agreement with Wayne Ratliff in which Ratliff exchanged his future royalty stream on dBASE into equity in Ashton Tate, thereby significantly increasing the profitability of the company.

Cole also took steps to control its technology by creating an in-house development organization (headed by Harvey Jean, formerly of JPL, as VP engineering), and to diversify by funding two outside development teams: Forefront Corporation (the developer of the product that would later be named "Framework") and Queue Associates. That Spring, Ashton Tate released Friday!. By the time of the November 1983 IPO, the company had grown to 228 employees. The IPO raised $14 million. When the fiscal year ended in January 1984, revenues had more than doubled to $43 million and net income had jumped from $1.1 million (fiscal 1983) to $5.3 million.

By early 1984 InfoWorld estimated that Ashton-Tate was the world's sixth-largest microcomputer-software company. dBASE II reportedly had 70% of the microcomputer-database market, with more than 150,000 copies sold. Ashton-Tate published a catalog listing more than 700 applications written in the language, and more than 30 book, audio, video, and computer tutorials taught dBASE. Other companies produced hundreds of utilities that worked with the database, which Ratliff believed contributed to Ashton-Tate's success; "You might say it's because the software is incomplete. There are 'problems' with dBASE—omissions for other software developers to fill". He noted that "If they weren't with us, they'd be against us", and Cole promised to always notify third parties before announcing a new product or changing dBase's marketing. In May the company announced, and in July shipped, dBASE III as the successor to dBASE II.  July also saw the release of Framework, an integrated office suite developed by Forefront Corporation and funded by Ashton-Tate. These were the company's first products released with copy protection schemes in an attempt to stop software piracy.

dBASE III was the first release written in the C programming language to make it easier to support and port to other platforms. To facilitate the rewrite, an automatic conversion program was used to convert the original Vulcan code from CP/M Z-80 and DOS 8088 assembly language code into C, which resulted in the beginnings of a difficult to maintain legacy code base that would haunt the company for many years to come. This also had the side effect of making the program run somewhat slower, which was of some concern when it first shipped. As newer machines came out the problem was erased through increased performance of the hardware, and the "problem" simply went away.

In fall 1984 the company had over 500 employees and was taking in $40 million a year in sales (with approximately $15 million in Europe), the vast majority of it from dBASE or related utilities.

Ed Esber 
Ashton Tate held a large company wide convention aboard the Queen Mary in Long Beach, California, in early August, 1984 and presented the new products like Friday! to hundreds of clients, and staff. Immediately after the Queen Mary convention, George Tate suddenly died of a heart attack at the age of 40 on August 10, 1984. David Cole on October 29 announced his resignation and left for Ziff-Davis, leaving Ed Esber to become CEO. Cole hired Esber because he was the marketing expert who launched VisiCalc and who built the first distribution channels for personal computer software. (VisiCalc was the first spreadsheet and is credited for sparking the personal computer revolution and was the first commercially successful personal computer software package.)

During Esber's seven-year tenure, Ashton Tate had its most prosperous years and a few of its most controversial. It is also when Ashton-Tate became one of the "Big Three" personal computer software companies who had weathered the early 1980s "shakeout", and was considered an equal of Microsoft and Lotus Development. Under his leadership Ashton-Tate sales grew over 600% from $40M to over $318M.

In November, shortly after Esber took over, dBASE III version 1.1 was released to correct some of the numerous bugs found in the 1.0 release. As soon as the 1.1 release shipped, development focus turned to the next version, internally referred to as dBASE III version 2.0. Among other things, the 2.0 release would have a new kernel for increased speed, and new functions to improve application development.

Esber's relationship with Wayne Ratliff, however, was tumultuous, and Ratliff quit several months later. Eventually a group of sales and marketing employees left to join Ratliff at Migent Corporation to compete with Ashton Tate. Later (January 1987), Ashton-Tate would sue Migent for alleged misappropriation of trade secrets. Ratliff would eventually approach Esber about rejoining Ashton-Tate and insisting on reporting directly to him.  Jeb Long took over as dBASE's main architect in Ratliff's absence.

In October 1985 the company released dBASE III Developer's Edition. Internally this release was known as version 1.2. It had some of the new features expected to be in the upcoming 2.0 release, including the new kernel and features primarily useful to application developers. Version 1.2 was one of the most stable dBASE versions that Ashton-Tate ever released, if not the most stable. It was also one of the least known and most often forgotten.  Mostly, it was a release to appease developers waiting for 2.0 (dBASE III+).

In late 1985 the company moved its headquarters to the final location at 20101 Hamilton Avenue in Torrance. Development was spread throughout California, although dBASE development was centered at the Glendale offices.

dBASE III+ and third party clones (1986–1987) 
dBASE III+, a version including character-based menus for improved ease-of-use, had troubles maturing and had to be recalled just prior to its release in early 1986 due to an incorrect setting in the copy-protection scheme. However the company handled this with some aplomb, and although some customers were affected, Ashton-Tate's handling of the problems did much to improve customer relations rather than sour them. dBASE III+ would go on to be just as successful as dBASE II had been, powering the company to $318 million in sales in 1987.

dBASE had grown unwieldy over the years, so Esber started a project under Mike Benson to re-architect dBASE for the new world of client–server software. It was to be a complete rewrite, designed as the next generation dBASE.

dBASE was a complex product, and a thriving third-party industry sprung up to support it. A number of products were introduced to improve certain aspects of dBASE, both programming and day-to-day operations. As Ashton-Tate announced newer versions of dBASE, they would often decide to include some of the functionality provided by the third parties as features of the base system. Predictably, sales of the third-party version would instantly stop, whether or not the new version of dBASE actually included that feature. After a number of such vaporware announcements, third-party developers started becoming upset.

One particularly important addition to the lineup of third-party add-ons was the eventual release of dBASE compilers, which would take a dBASE project and compile it and link it into a stand-alone runnable program. This not only made the resulting project easy to distribute to end users, but it did not require dBASE to be installed on that machine. These compilers essentially replaced Ashton-Tate's own solution to this problem, a $395 per-machine "runtime" copy of dBASE, and thereby removed one source of their income. The most successful such compiler was Clipper, from Nantucket Software. Eventually a number of these were developed into full-blown dBASE clones.

Esber was upset with the companies that cloned dBASE products but was always supportive of third-party developers, whom he viewed as an important part of the dBASE ecosystem. He neither believed nor supported companies that cloned dBASE, in the process leveraging the millions of dollars his shareholders had paid to market dBASE. Starting with minor actions, he eventually went to great lengths to stop cloners with cease-and-desist letters and threats of legal action. At one industry conference he even stood up and threatened to sue anyone who made a dBASE clone, shouting "Make my day!". This sparked great debates about the ownership of computer languages and chants of "innovation not litigation".

As a result of this continued conflict, the third-party community slowly moved some of their small business customers away from dBASE. Fortunately for Ashton-Tate, large corporations were standardizing on dBASE.

dBASE IV: Decline and fall (1988–1990) 
Ashton-Tate had been promising a new version of the core dBASE product line starting around 1986. The new version was going to be more powerful, faster, and easier to create databases with. It would have improved indexes and networking, support SQL internally as well as interacting with SQL Server, and include a compiler. Ashton-Tate announced dBASE IV in February 1988 with an anticipated release set for July of that year. dBASE IV was eventually released in October 1988 as two products: Standard and Developer's editions.

Unfortunately, dBASE IV was both slow and very buggy. Bugs are not at all that surprising in a major product update, something that would normally be fixed with a "dot-one" release before too much damage was done. This situation had occurred with dBASE III for instance, and Ashton-Tate had quickly fixed the problems. However a number of issues conspired to make the dBASE IV 1.0 release a disaster.

 For one, while dBASE IV did include a compiler, it was not what the developer community was expecting. That community was looking for a product that would generate stand-alone, executable code, similar to Clipper.  The dBASE IV compiler did produce object code, but still required the full dBASE IV product to run the result. Many believed that Ashton-Tate intended dBASE IV to compete with and eliminate the third-party developers.  The announcement alone did much to upset the livelihood of the various compiler authors.
 More problematic however was the instability of the program. The full scale of the problem only became obvious as more people attempted to use the product, especially those who upgraded to the new version.  The bugs were so numerous that most users gave up, resigned to wait for a dot-one release.  As word got out, sales slumped as existing users chose to hold off on their upgrades, and new users chose to ignore the product.

Neither of these issues would, by themselves, kill the product. dBASE had an extremely large following and excellent name recognition. All that was needed was an update that addressed the problems. At the time of its release, there was a general consensus within Ashton-Tate that a bug-fix version would be released within six months of the 1.0 release.  If that had happened, the loyal users might have been more accepting of the product.

Rather than do that, Ashton-Tate management instead turned their attention to the next generation of applications, code named Diamond.  Diamond was to be a new, integrated product line capable of sharing large sets of data across applications.  This effort had been underway for years and was already consuming many of the resources in the company's Glendale, Torrance, Walnut Creek and Los Gatos (Northern California Product Center) offices.  However, once it became apparent that Diamond was years away from becoming a product, and with poor reviews and slipping sales of dBASE IV 1.0, Ashton-Tate returned its focus to fixing dBASE IV.

It was almost two years before dBASE IV 1.1 finally shipped (in July 1990). During this time many customers took the opportunity to try out the legions of dBASE clones that had appeared recently, notably FoxBase and Clipper.

Sales of dBASE had plummeted. The company had about 63% of the overall database market in 1988, and only 43% in 1989. In the final four quarters as a company, Ashton-Tate lost close to $40 million. In August 1989, the company laid off over 400 of its 1,800 employees. The Microsoft partnership for a version called the Ashton-Tate/Microsoft SQL Server also came to nothing, as Ashton-Tate's sales channels were not prepared to sell what was then a high-end database.  The first version of SQL Server also only ran on IBM OS/2, which also limited its success. A version of dBASE that communicated directly with SQL Server, called dBASE IV Server Edition, was released in 1990, and was reviewed as the best available client for SQL Server (in both Databased Advisor and DBMS magazines), but the product never gained traction and was one of the casualties of the Borland acquisition. Microsoft eventually released Access in this role instead.

Sale to Borland (1991) 
Esber had been trying to grow the company for years via acquisitions or combining forces with other software companies, including merger discussions with Lotus in 1985 and again in 1989. Ashton-Tate's strategically inept board passed up numerous opportunities for industry-changing mergers.  Other merger discussions that Ashton-Tate's board rejected or reached an impasse on included Cullinet, Computer Associates, Informix, Symantec and Microsoft. (Microsoft would later acquire Fox Software after Borland acquired Ashton-Tate and the United States Department of Justice forced Borland to not assert ownership of the dBASE language.)

In 1990 Esber proposed a merger with Borland. During the first discussions, the board backed out and dismissed Esber thinking him crazy to entertain a merger of equals (combining the companies at existing market valuations) with the smaller competitor Borland, and on February 11, 1991, replaced him as CEO with William P. "Bill" Lyons. Lyons had been hired to run the non-dBASE business and heretofore had been unsuccessful. Lyons would ship dBASE IV 1.1, a product Esber managed and was already in beta when let go.

After giving the board a merger compensation package (including individual bonuses of $250 thousand) and giving the management team repriced options and golden parachutes, the board and Lyons reinitiated discussions with Borland, but this time structured as a take-over of Ashton-Tate with a significant premium over Ashton-Tate's current market valuation but substantially below the price Esber had negotiated.

Wall Street liked the deal and Borland stock would reach new highs shortly before and after the merger. Some considered the $439 million in stock they paid to be too much. Philippe Kahn, CEO of Borland, apparently did not consult with his management team prior to committing to acquire Ashton Tate over a weekend visit to Los Angeles.

The Borland merger was not a smooth one. Borland had been marketing the Paradox database specifically to compete with dBASE, and its programmers considered their system to be far superior to dBASE. The Paradox group was extremely upset whenever Kahn so much as mentioned dBASE, and an intense turf war broke out within the company. Borland was also developing a competitor product called The Borland dBase Compiler for Windows. This product was designed by Gregor Freund who led a small team developing this fast, object-oriented version of dBASE. It was when Borland showed the product to the Ashton-Tate team that they finally conceded that they had lost the battle for dBASE.

Nevertheless, Kahn was observant of the trends in the computer market, and decided that both products should be moved forward to become truly Microsoft Windows-based. The OO-dBASE compiler was no more able to run under Windows than was dBASE IV, causing Borland to abandon both code bases in 1993 and spin up a new team to create a new product, eventually delivered as dBASE for Windows in 1994.  Meanwhile, Paradox was deliberately downplayed in the developer market since dBASE was now the largest Borland product.  Microsoft introduced Access in late 1992, and eventually took over almost all of the Windows database market. Further, in the summer of 1992 Microsoft acquired Ohio-based Fox Software, makers of the dBASE-like products FoxBASE+ and FoxPro.  With Microsoft behind FoxPro, many dBASE and Clipper software developers would start working in FoxPro instead. By the time dBASE for Windows was released, the market hardly noticed. Microsoft appears to have neglected FoxPro subsequent to the acquisition, perhaps because they also owned and promoted Microsoft Access, a direct competitor to dBASE. Certainly, the PC database market became a great deal less competitive as a result of their deal to buy FoxPro.

When Borland eventually sold its Quattro Pro and Paradox products to Novell, where they would be joined with WordPerfect in an attempt to match Microsoft Office, Borland was left with InterBase, which Esber had purchased in the late 1980s and had its origins as a derivative of the RDB database work at DEC.  Borland's ongoing strategy was to refocus its development tools on the corporate market with client–server applications, so Interbase fitted in as a low-end tool and a good generic SQL database for prototyping.  This proved to be the longest lasting and most positive part of the Ashton-Tate acquisition, ironic since it was almost an oversight and little known to Borland until they acquired Ashton-Tate.

Overall, the Ashton-Tate purchase proved to be unsuccessful.  Several years later, Philippe Kahn would leave Borland amidst declining financial performance, including many years of losses.

Downfall 
While Ashton-Tate's downfall can be attributed to several factors, chief among them were:

 the over-reliance on a single-product line (dBASE)
 the appalling quality of dBASE IV on release, compounded by the complete failure to take any action to rectify this when it was needed
 a focus on future products without addressing the needs of the current customers
 the departure of Wayne Ratliff

Any one of these would have been a surmountable problem, but combined they brought about the swift decline of the company.

Ashton-Tate's dependence on dBASE is understandable. It was one of the earliest killer applications in the CP/M world, along with WordStar and (on other platforms) VisiCalc, and was able to make the transition to the IBM PC to maintain its dominance. Its success alone is what created and sustained the company through the first nine years.  However, the overreliance on dBASE for revenue had a catastrophic effect on the company when dBASE IV sales tanked.

In the end, the poor quality and extremely late release of dBASE IV drove existing customers away and kept new ones from accepting it.  This loss of revenue for the cash cow was too much for the company to bear, and combined with management missteps, eventually led to the sale to the upstart Borland International.

Non-dBASE products 
Through the mid-1980s Esber increasingly looked to diversify the company's holdings, and purchased a number of products to roll into the Ashton-Tate lineup. By and large most of these acquisitions failed and did not result in the revenue expected. This experience is another illustration of the difficulty of integrating acquired companies and products in a rapidly changing technological market.

Friday! 
Friday was a product conceived during the David Cole era at Ashton-Tate. Named after Robinson Crusoe's man Friday, because, by using the program, one could supposedly "get everything done by Friday!", this was a simple personal information manager (PIM) program written around 1983, years before that acronym became popular.  It used a customized version of dBASE II, predating the dBASE III product.  Several design flaws surfaced in beta-testing that required a major design and rewriting of code.  These changes were made in-house by Jim Lewis who soon after joined Ashton-Tate as a lead developer and product manager.  After a significant advertising campaign and modest interest, Friday! was eventually withdrawn from the market. (See also, Microsoft Bob.)

Javelin 
On April 10, 1986, Ashton-Tate signed a marketing deal with Javelin Software to distribute their financial modeling software named Javelin outside of the US and Canada.

Framework 
Their most successful attempt at a breakout was with Framework.  Framework, like dBASE before it, was the brainchild of a single author, Robert Carr, who felt that integrated applications offered huge benefits over a selection of separate apps doing the same thing. In 1983 he had a runnable demo of his product, and showed it to Ashton-Tate who immediately signed a deal to support development in exchange for marketing rights.

Framework was an integrated DOS-based document-based office suite with an interactive computer language named FRED that combined in an outliner a word processor, spreadsheet, mini-database application, charting tool, and a terminal program. Later versions also added e-mail support and a FRED Developer's toolKit with a FRED RunTime version that allowed developers to distribute free versions of Framework that run FRED applications. Framework also had the distinction of being available in over 14 languages, and it was more successful in Europe than in North America. Although DOS based, Framework supported a fully functional GUI based on character graphics (similar to Borland's OWL).

Framework eventually got locked into an industry battle, primarily with Lotus Symphony, and later with Microsoft Works. The market was never large to begin with, as most customers chose to purchase the large, monolithic versions of applications even if they never used the extra functionality. Borland later sold Framework to Selections & Functions, who continue to sell it today.

MultiMate 
MultiMate was a word processor package created to copy the basic operation of a Wang dedicated word processor workstation on the PC. In the early 1980s many companies used MultiMate to replace these expensive single-purpose systems with PCs, MultiMate offering them an easy migration path. Although it wasn't clear at the time, this migration was largely complete by the time Ashton-Tate bought the company in December 1985 from Multimate International for about $20 million[ 9] in a transduction that an Ashton-Tate press release called "the largest ever in the microcomputer software industry". Sales had plateaued, although they were still fairly impressive at the time. What was originally a deliberate attempt to copy the Wang system now made the product seem hopelessly outdated, and it would require a major upgrade to remain useful. WordPerfect took advantage of these issues and took market share to a degree essentially lethal for MultiMate.

The Master series of products 
Ashton-Tate purchased Decision Resources of Westport, Connecticut, in 1986. Decision Resources had created the Chart Master, Sign Master, Map Master and Diagram Master programs. These were simple, effective business charting/drawing programs that counted on various spreadsheet programs being so poor at charting that people would gladly pay for another program to improve on them. By the time Ashton-Tate purchased the company it was clear that newer generations of spreadsheet programs would improve their charting abilities to the point where the Decision Resource products wouldn't be needed, but the company was also working on a new drawing package that was more interesting in the long run.

After the purchase was completed it became clear that the drawing product was inadequate. Although it was released as Draw Applause it never sold well.

Byline 
Byline was an early desktop publishing program developed by the company SkiSoft and distributed and marketed by Ashton-Tate.  When it was introduced sometime around 1987, it was both fairly inexpensive and easy to use, and gained a small but devoted following.  Users designed a page by filling out an onscreen form that described page characteristics: margins, columns, font and size, and so on. The program created the page and an onscreen preview. This method of working was in contrast to the more directly interactive WYSIWYG approach taken by Aldus PageMaker and Ventura Publisher, which became more popular as windowing systems and GUIs became more common. Also, as time went on more and more so-called desktop publishing features were added to popular word processing software, probably reducing the market for such a low-end desktop publishing program.  Oddly, Byline was written in the Forth programming language.

RapidFile 
A flat-file database program launched in October 1986 that was commonly used to create mailing labels and form letters on PCs running the DOS operating system. RapidFile was also adept at organizing and manipulating data imported from other software programs. It was designed to be a fast, easy-to-use and less-expensive database for those who did not require the sophisticated capabilities of dBASE. It achieved moderate success for Ashton-Tate, but a version for Microsoft Windows was never developed. RapidFile is unusual in that it was developed in the programming language Forth.

Rapidfile version 1.2 was released in 1986, with versions available in several languages including English, French and Dutch. Although Rapidfile was created for the DOS operating system, information is available  to show that it can be persuaded to work reasonably well in the DOS box of Microsoft Windows 95, 98, 2000 and XP, and also under Linux using the DOSemu  emulation software.

Apple Macintosh products 
When Apple Computer was introducing the Macintosh ("Mac") in the early 1980s, Ashton-Tate was one of the "big three" software companies that Apple desperately wanted to support their new platform. When approached, Ashton-Tate indicated an interest in becoming a major player in the new market.

As early as the winter of 1984, only a few months after the Macintosh introduction, the company haired a small Macintosh database development team and moved them to their Glendale development center to work on what would later be known as dBASE Mac. Soon after this, in early 1985, they agreed to fund development of a spreadsheet program being developed by Randy Wigginton, former project lead of MacWrite. Years later they added a "high-end" word processor from Ann Arbor Softworks, who were in the midst of a rather public debacle while trying to release FullWrite Professional, which was now almost a year late.

Ed Esber and Apple Computer chairman John Sculley jointly announced Ashton Tate's family of Mac products in Palo Alto, California. dBASE Mac finally shipped in September 1987, but it was dBASE in name only. Users were dismayed to learn that in order to interact with their major investment in dBASE on the PC, their applications would have to be re-written from scratch. Adding to their frustration was the fact that it crashed frequently and was extremely slow. Given that the program was really a completely new Mac-only system, it had to compete with other Mac-only database systems like 4th Dimension, Helix and FileMaker.

FullWrite and Full Impact were released in 1988. Both were liked by reviewers and had leading edge features. FullWrite was an outstanding product, while Full Impact had the bad luck of being timed just after a major new release of Microsoft Excel and the release of Informix Wingz.

All three products were excellent at their core, but were not viewed as a family and needed to link together more cleanly. They all also needed a solid follow-up release to address some of the bugs and performance issues. However, no major upgrades were ever shipped for either FullWrite or dBASE Mac, and the only major upgrade to FullImpact shipped a full two years after release. Releases of Microsoft Word and Excel soon closed some of the feature gaps, and as the Mac OS changed the products became increasingly difficult to run. Microsoft embarked on a campaign in earnest to discredit and kill Ashton-Tate's products, at one time exaggerating the system requirements for FullWrite, and going so far as to delete Ashton Tate software from Mac dealers' demonstration computers.

FullWrite was later sold off by Borland in 1994 to Akimbo Systems, but by that time Microsoft Word had achieved market domination and they, too, eventually gave up on it. dBASE Mac was sold off in 1990 and re-released as nuBASE, but it was no more successful and was gone within a year. Full Impact simply disappeared.

SQL Server 
One problem with dBASE and similar products is that it was not based on the client–server model. That means that when a database is used by a number of users on a network, the system normally relies on the underlying network software to deliver entire files to the user's desktop machine where the actual query work is carried out. This creates heavy load on the network, as each user "pulls down" the database files, often to do the same query over and over. In contrast, a client–server system receives only small commands from the user's machine, processes the command locally on the server, and then returns only those results the user was looking for. Overall network use is dramatically lowered.

A client–server database is a fundamentally different sort of system than a traditional single-user system like dBASE, and although they share many features in common, it is typically not a simple task to take an existing single-user product and turn it into a true client–server system. As the business world became increasingly networked, Ashton-Tate's system would become irrelevant without updating to the client server era.

Ed Esber and Bill Gates introduced SQL Server to the world in a joint New York press conference. The basic idea was to use SQL Server as a back-end and dBASE as the front-end, allowing the existing dBASE market to use their forms and programming knowledge on top of a SQL system. SQL Server was actually a product developed by Sybase corporation, which Microsoft had licensed. From a business perspective this had little direct effect on the company, at least in the short term.

dBASE continued to sell well, and the company eventually peaked at $318M in yearly sales. During this period, Esber hired some of the most brilliant database engineers in the industry, including Dr. Moshe Zloof from IBM, Harry Wong, and Mike Benson (who would later head Esber's efforts to rebuild a new dBASE).

Tate Publishing 
The Tate Publishing division of Ashton-Tate initially published books about Ashton-Tate's software; in October 1988 it branched out to third-party software.

Lawsuits 
Esber had earlier threatened a group of dBASE users who were attempting to define a standard dBASE file format. With this standard, anyone could create a dBASE compatible system, something Esber simply wouldn't allow. But as soon as they were issued the cease-and-desist, they simply changed their effort to create a "new" standard known as "xBase".

Esber had previously decided to sue one of the clone companies involved, then known as Fox Software. By the time the case worked its way to court in 1990, Fox Software had released FoxPro and was busy increasing market share. If the court case was successful, Ashton-Tate could stop FoxPro and use the precedent to stop the other clones as well, allowing dBASE to regain a footing and recover from the dBASE IV incident.

These hopes came to an end when the case was thrown out of court. During the initial proceedings it was learned that dBASE's file format and language had been based on a mainframe product used at JPL, where Ratliff had been working when he first created Vulcan. The credibility of Ratliff was jeopardized by his alternate claims of ownership while at Ashton Tate and then supporting the roots at JPL after he left. All the facts were never sorted out and Ashton-Tate's competitors had a self-interest motivated field day in writing amicus briefs.

When the federal judge reviewed the work of his clerks he overturned his earlier ruling, and decided to hear the case on whether or not Ashton-Tate owned the language. In April 1991, the judge vindicated Esber's decision to protect Ashton-Tate's investment of several hundred million in the development and marketing of dBase, by ruling that Ashton-Tate did own the language. Unfortunately, his earlier ruling had already done considerable damage. Eventually, as part of the merger with Borland, the US Justice Department required that Borland not assert copyright claims to menu commands and the command language of dBASE.  This paved the way for Microsoft to buy Fox Software.

Products 
 dBASE
 Framework – integrated word processor, outliner and spreadsheet application
 InterBase – purchased from Groton Database Systems
 MultiMate – DOS-based word processor
 RapidFile – database application written in MMSForth

References

Further reading 
 Ashton-Tate – from Ed Esber's official website contains host of articles and financial performance
 Interview with Wayne Ratliff – contains many notes on the early history of dBASE
 Ashton-Tate copyright shield for dBASE line stripped by court order – details the court case in which dBASE's history lost them the ability to claim copyright.
 

Software companies established in 1980
Defunct software companies of the United States
Borland
Defunct companies based in Greater Los Angeles
Defunct companies based in California
Companies based in Torrance, California
1991 mergers and acquisitions
Software companies disestablished in 1991
1980 establishments in California
1991 disestablishments in California